Acharya Pingala (c. 3rd2nd century BCE) was an ancient Indian poet and mathematician, and the author of the  (also called the Pingala-sutras), the earliest known treatise on Sanskrit prosody.

The  is a work of eight chapters in the late Sūtra style, not fully comprehensible without a commentary. It has been dated to the last few centuries BCE. According to some historians Maharshi Pingala was the brother of Pāṇini, the famous Sanskrit grammarian, considered the first descriptive linguist. Another think tank identifies him as Patanjali, the 2nd century CE scholar who authored Mahabhashya.

Combinatorics
The  presents the first known description of a binary numeral system in connection with the systematic enumeration of metres with fixed patterns of short and long syllables. Pingala's work also includes material related to the Fibonacci numbers, called .

Pingala is credited with the first use of binary numbers, using light (laghu) and heavy (guru) syllables to describe combinatorics of Sanskrit metre. Because of this, Pingala is sometimes also credited with the first use of zero, as he used the Sanskrit word śūnya to explicitly refer to the number.

Editions
A. Weber, Indische Studien 8, Leipzig, 1863.

Notes

See also

Chandas
Sanskrit prosody
Indian mathematics
Indian mathematicians
History of the binomial theorem
List of Indian mathematicians

References
Amulya Kumar Bag, 'Binomial theorem in ancient India', Indian J. Hist. Sci. 1 (1966), 68–74.
George Gheverghese Joseph (2000). The Crest of the Peacock, p. 254, 355. Princeton University Press.
Klaus Mylius, Geschichte der altindischen Literatur, Wiesbaden (1983).

External links
Math for Poets and Drummers,  Rachel W. Hall, Saint Joseph's University, 2005.
Mathematics of Poetry,  Rachel W. Hall

Fibonacci numbers
Ancient Indian mathematicians
Ancient Sanskrit grammarians
Indian Sanskrit scholars
2nd-century BC mathematicians